Chai Prakan is a district (amphoe) in the northern part of Chiang Mai province in northern Thailand.

Geography

Neighbouring districts are (from the south clockwise) Phrao, Chiang Dao, Fang of Chiang Mai Province and Mae Suai of Chiang Rai province.

The Khun Tan Range stretches from north to south along the eastern side of the district. The western tip of the district lies within the Daen Lao Range.

History
The minor district (king amphoe) Chai Prakarn was created on 1 January 1988, when four tambons were split off from Fang District. It was upgraded to a full district on 4 July 1994.

Administration

Central administration 
Chai Prakan is divided into four sub-districts (tambons), which are further subdivided into 44 administrative villages (muban).

Local administration 
There are two sub-district municipalities (thesaban tambon) in the district:
 Chai Prakan consisting of sub-district Pong Tam and parts of sub-districts Si Dong Yen and Nong Bua.
 Nong Bua consisting of parts of sub-district Nong Bua.

There are two sub-district administrative organizations (SAO) in the district:
 Si Dong Yen consisting of parts of sub-district Si Dong Yen.
 Mae Thalop consisting of sub-district Mae Thalop.

References

External links
amphoe.com

Chai Prakarn